Hunca Cosmetics was established in 1957 in Istanbul. The company's founding father is Adnan Hunca.  It was created as a family company producing cosmetics and toiletries. The company's factory is located in the Çerkezköy Organized Industrial Zone in the Çerkezköy district of Tekirdağ and has distributors in Europe, the Middle East and Asia.

References

External links
Hunca Website

Cosmetics companies of Turkey
Manufacturing companies based in Istanbul
Chemical companies established in 1957
Turkish brands